The tansy is a plant.

Tansy may also refer to:

Tansy beetle (Chrysolina graminis), a species of leaf beetle which feeds on tansy
 Tansy cakes, medieval English dessert
Tansy Davies (born 1973), British composer
Tansy Rayner Roberts (born 1978), Australian fantasy writer
Tansy Saylor, a main character in Conjure Wife, a supernatural horror novel by Fritz Leiber
Tansy Taylor, in the film adaptation Night of the Eagle
Teton River (Montana), also known as the Tansy River
Tansy (film), a 1921 British silent drama